Dillinger is a surname of German origin, and has additional uses.

Notable people with the surname
 Adolf Dillinger (1846–1922), German printer and publisher
 Bob Dillinger (1918–2009), professional baseball player
 Daz Dillinger (born 1973), hip hop music producer and rapper
 Edmund Dillinger (born 1935), German Roman Catholic clergy
 Harley Dillinger (1894-1959), professional baseball player
 Jared Dillinger (born 1984), Filipino-American professional basketball player
 John Dillinger (1903–1934), outlaw gangster of the Great Depression era
 Wendy Dillinger (born 1974), head women's soccer coach at Iowa State University

Stage name
 Dillinger (musician)
 Dillinger Four (punk band)
 Tye Dillinger (born 1981), professional wrestler

Fictional entities
 Ed Dillinger, the fictional villain in the Walt Disney Pictures film Tron (1982)
 François Dillinger, character of C. D. Payne's novel Youth in Revolt (1993)

See also 
 Dellinger (surname)
 Dillinger (disambiguation)

German-language surnames
de:Dillinger